Jean Palméro (17 December 1912, Marseille – 15 January 1999) was a French politician. He represented the French Section of the Workers' International (SFIO) in the National Assembly from 1956 to 1958.

References

1912 births
1999 deaths
Politicians from Marseille
French Section of the Workers' International politicians
Deputies of the 3rd National Assembly of the French Fourth Republic
French military personnel of World War II
French Resistance members